Alison Paige Aguilar (born August 28, 1995) is an American, former collegiate All-American, medal-winning Olympian, softball player at shortstop. She played college softball at Washington from 2014 to 2017 where she was named a three-time First Team All-Pac-12 and a National Fastpitch Coaches Association Second and Third Team All-American in her last two years. She won the Cowles Cup with the Scrap Yard Dawgs of the National Pro Fastpitch in 2017. She also played professionally in Japan. She represented Team USA at the 2020 Summer Olympics and won a silver medal.

Early life
Aguilar was born in Roseville, California to parents Mark and Kristin Aguilar. Aguilar started softball at an early age playing Bobby Sox in Rio Linda, California, where she credits  Coach Anita Orozco for showing her the ropes at such an early age. She graduated from Casa Roble High School in Orangevale, California in 2013 with a 3.8 GPA and with four letters in softball.

Playing career

College
Aguilar played college softball at Washington. She came to Washington as a slap hitter, but Husky coach, Heather Tarr, decided that she should swing away. Aguilar made this transition, and became one of the best power hitters in the country, hitting 21 home runs in her Junior season in 2016.

Professional
Aguilar was drafted thirteenth overall by the Scrap Yard Dawgs in the 2017 NPF Draft. During her first season with the team, she helped the team win the Cowles Cup, their first championship in program history.

International career
Aguilar was selected to represent the United States at the 2016 Women's Softball World Championship, where the team won the gold medal. Aguilar hit .273 in the tournament with a Home Run and 5 RBIs.

Statistics

Personal life
Aguilar is a Christian. She has said “I used to eat, breathe and sleep softball. But when God was introduced to my life and became my life, softball no longer defined me. God’s plans and the ability He’s given me in softball are why I play. I see His hand in every part of my journey. Embodying the character of Christ is my end goal; it’s not just about winning a gold medal. I want to let the light of Christ shine through me.”

References

1995 births
Living people
Sportspeople from Roseville, California
Washington Huskies softball players
Softball players from California
Scrap Yard Dawgs players
Olympic softball players of the United States
Pan American Games medalists in softball
Pan American Games gold medalists for the United States
Softball players at the 2019 Pan American Games
Medalists at the 2019 Pan American Games
Softball players at the 2020 Summer Olympics
Medalists at the 2020 Summer Olympics
Olympic silver medalists for the United States in softball
Olympic medalists in softball
21st-century American women